Walnut Street Bridge may refer to:

Bridges in the United States (by state then city)
 Walnut Street Bridge (Wilmington, Delaware), a bridge that spans the Christina River in Wilmington, Delaware
 Walnut Street Bridge (Mazeppa, Minnesota), listed on the National Register of Historic Places in Wabasha County, Minnesota
 Walnut Street Bridge (Harrisburg, Pennsylvania), a truss bridge that spans the Susquehanna River, listed on the National Register of Historic Places in Dauphin County, Pennsylvania
 Walnut Street Bridge (Philadelphia, Pennsylvania), a bridge that spans the Schuylkill River
 Walnut Street Bridge (Yankton, South Dakota), listed on the National Register of Historic Places in Yankton County, South Dakota
 Walnut Street Bridge (Chattanooga, Tennessee), a truss bridge across the Tennessee River, listed on the National Register of Historic Places in Hamilton County, Tennessee